The Rue Roquépine is a street in the 8th arrondissement of Paris, France.

Since 2019, the Protestant temple at 5 Rue Roquépine houses the local group of Girl Scouts Eclaireurs Unionistes de France. The Roquépine marine unit is housed in a spacious room on the second floor of the temple.

References

1774 establishments in France